Pherzawl district (Meitei pronunciation:/ˌpherˈzâwl/) is a district of Manipur state in India.

Location and politics 
Pherzawl District is located in the southern part of the state of Manipur. It is bounded on the east by Churachandpur District; on the north by Tamenglong District, Noney District and Jiribam district; on the west by the Cachar District of Assam and on the South by Sinlung Hills, Mizoram. Pherzawl District is located between 93° 11' 16.0440' East Longitude and 24° 15' 43.0524' North Latitude and is in the southern part of Manipur state. Pherzawl District has approximately 200 villages, according to the government's record.

The Pherzawl District came into existence on 8 December 2016 by joining 55-AC Tipaimukh (ST) and 56-AC Thanlon (ST) with its headquarters at Pherzawl. Despite the controversy surrounding the creation of seven new revenue districts in Manipur, the people of Pherzawl District welcomed the decision with celebrations on 16 December 2016, when Manipur Chief Minister Okram Ibobi Singh inaugurated the administrative centre at Pherzawl village.

Transport

Pherzawl is connected with the state capital Imphal via roads. A bus service running between Imphal and Pherzawl began in 2017.

Climate and geography 

The district is under humid subtropical climate. The soil is moderately fertile with clay loam soil with little patches of clay and loam. The elevation of the District is 1037 meters, or 3,402 feet.

Languages

See also 
 List of populated places in Pherzawl district

Notes

References

External links
 Official government site

 
Districts of Manipur
Minority Concentrated Districts in India
2016 establishments in Manipur
Constituencies established in 2016
Hmar